Frank Leo Brazill (August 11, 1899 – November 3, 1976) was a professional baseball first baseman whose career spanned 19 seasons (1919–1938). During the 1921 and 1922 Major League Baseball (MLB) season he was a member of the Philadelphia Athletics.

Brazill made his professional debut in the minor leagues in 1918 as a member of the Cumberland Colts. The other minor league teams he played for were the Hartford Senators (1919), the Winnipeg Maroons (1919), the Atlanta Crackers (1920), the St. Paul Saints (1920), the Portland Beavers (1921–24, 1928), the Seattle Indians (1925), the Los Angeles Angels (1926–27), the Mission Reds (1928), the Memphis Chickasaws (1929–1934), the Greenville Buckshots (1934), the Nashville Volunteers (1935), the Oklahoma City Indians (1935), the Tulsa Oilers (1935), the Greenwood Chiefs/Giants (1936–37) and the Fort Smith Giants (1938). He also managed several minor league teams from 1934 to 1939.

The Portland, Seattle and Los Angeles clubs he played with were all in the Pacific Coast League. In 2007, Brazill was inducted to the Pacific Coast League Hall of Fame.

References

External links

1899 births
1976 deaths
Baseball players from Pennsylvania
Major League Baseball first basemen
Philadelphia Athletics players
Portland Beavers managers
Cumberland Colts players
Hartford Senators players
Winnipeg Maroons (baseball) players
Atlanta Crackers players
St. Paul Saints (AA) players
Portland Beavers players
Seattle Indians players
Los Angeles Angels (minor league) players
Mission Reds players
Memphis Chickasaws players
Greenville Buckshots players
Nashville Vols players
Oklahoma City Indians players
Tulsa Oilers (baseball) players
Greenwood Chiefs players
Greenwood Giants players
Fort Smith Giants players